Anna Pohlak (born 1 July 1993) is an Estonian sports sailor. At the 2012 Summer Olympics, she competed in the Women's Laser Radial class, finishing in 35th place.
She started sailing at the age of eleven and sailed in Optimist and Zoom8 classes.

References

External links
 
 
 
 
 

1993 births
Living people
Olympic sailors of Estonia
Estonian female sailors (sport)
Sailors at the 2012 Summer Olympics – Laser Radial